Panama Blue is rainforest spring water and a product of Panama Springs S.A. Panama Blue is a brand of luxury rainforest spring water. Panama Blue is the number one premium bottled water brand of Panama. The brand ambassadors are boxer Roberto Durán and Carolina Dementiev, a Panamanian model and triathlete.

Location of the springs 
Panama Blue is bottled at the source in the mountains of Cerro Azul, surrounded by the Chagres National Park in the Panamanian rainforest. 
The spring is located about 800m above sea level. Because of the soil, the volcanic rocks and the ecosystem people say that Panama Blue is one of the purest waters in the world.

Rainfall in Panama 
The annual precipitation in the mountains of Panama can reach up to 3000mm. This rain gets collected in a natural aquifer. There the water gathers minerals.

Water quality 
The bottling plant uses a clean room system. This system protects the water from air. According to the company, Panama Blue has its first contact with air whenever the bottle gets opened its first time by the customer. The company says that Panama Blue is 100% natural, it contains no chemical or pharmaceutical residues. The website of the company proclaims that the water is regularly tested in Germany. The bottling plant of Panama Springs S.A. is the only plant in Panama and Latin America certified with both ISO 14001 and ISO 9001.

Bottle design 
Panama Blue won a gold medal at the 2008 Water Innovation Awards in Wiesbaden, Germany, for its bottle design. The Flower shown on the bottle is called Pico de Loro and is a common flower within the area of the source of Panama Blue. The word Panama in the logo refers to the water's origin. The word Blue refers to the Cerro Azul area, which means Blue Hills.

Myth 
Today's Chagres National Park covers the Camino Real, the primitive road the Spanish conquerors used to transport gold from Panama City to the Caribbean harbor city of Portobelo. For marketing reasons the company uses the myth of Christopher Columbus exploring the Panama Blue springs.

Company

Owner 
According to official records Panama Springs S.A. is owned by Ulrich Schwark a former commercial banker. He is the biggest German employer in Panama. Panama Springs S.A. is a subsidiary of the Two Oceans Group.

Overseas 
Panama Springs S.A. was the first water brand of Panama exporting to the United States. Today Panama Blue is only sold in Panama. To reach a higher publicity overseas, Panama Springs S.A. sponsored the International Tourism Fair (ITB) at the famous Hotel Adlon Kempinski Berlin in 2014.

Future 
According to the company, Panama Springs S.A. is now in its tenth year of existence and in the process of expansion into foreign markets. Also the company is in the process of building a bigger bottling plant.

References

External links 

Bottled water brands